The Approved Driving Instructors National Joint Council (ADINJC) is a British organisation to bring together associations of local driving instructors, to allow driving instructors to act as a unified body when needed.

The ADINJC was formed in 1973 during the fuel crisis, leading figures at the time came together due to the fear that fuel shortage would stop driving instructors from working. Currently the ADINJC is the third largest organisation in the driving instruction industry (excluding driving schools, such as the British School of Motoring) with consultative status with the Driving Standards Agency (DSA).

The ADINJC aims to further the professional and financial interests of driving instructors through consultation with the Department for Transport and the DSA. It is a non-profit organisation with no salaried staff (though some officers receive an honorarium).

See also
 Approved Driving Instructor

Sources
https://web.archive.org/web/20070928204844/http://www.airso.co.uk/links.htm 
http://www.dsa.gov.uk/Documents/consult/Responses/Fees%2005%20to07/Response_Fees05List.pdf

Organizations established in 1973
Professional associations based in the United Kingdom
Non-profit organisations based in the United Kingdom
Driver's education